The Prodigal Son is the ninth album by progressive rock band Nektar released in 2001. It was their first studio album in over 20 years. The Prodigal Son includes two founding members, Roye Albrighton and Allan "Taff" Freeman.

Track listing

Personnel

Roye Albrighton – Lead Guitar, Bass, Lead Vocals
Allan  "Taff " Freeman – Keyboards, Backing Vocals
Ray Hardwick – Drums, Percussion

References

External links
http://www.thenektarproject.com/discography/tps.aspx

2001 albums
Nektar albums